Lai Cheng-ying (born 29 August 1931) born is a Taiwanese cinematographer and film director.

Lai began working for Agriculture Education Motion Pictures. After undergoing further training in color filmmaking in Japan, he returned to Taiwan's Central Motion Picture Corporation. Lai is regarded as a pioneer of color filmmaking in Taiwan and has won the Golden Horse Award for Best Color Cinematography in 1965, 1970, and 1972, for Beautiful Duckling, Stardust, and Execution in Autumn, respectively. When Lai began directing films, he hired Hou Hsiao-hsien as his screenwriter and assistant director.

References

1931 births
Living people
Taiwanese film directors
Taiwanese cinematographers